Punisher: War Zone – Original Motion Picture Soundtrack is the soundtrack for the film Punisher: War Zone, the album was released on November 25, 2008. The soundtrack includes the original track "War Zone", written for and inspired by the film, by musician Rob Zombie. An online contest was held by Lionsgate, and led to 7 Days Away (a band local to Connersville, IN) taking first place with the track "Take Me Away".

Track listing

Reception
The soundtrack reached the number 23 slot on Billboard's Top Independent Albums chart.

References

External links
 Official soundtrack site
 IMDB

Marvel Comics film soundtracks
Punisher in music
2000s film soundtrack albums
2008 soundtrack albums
Lionsgate Records soundtracks
Nu metal albums